Millbillillie meteorite is a meteorite named after the cattle station in Western Australia on which it fell in October 1960. It is classified as a eucrite achondrite, a kind of stony meteorite.

History

A fireball was observed "with sparks coming off it" by two stationworkers while they were opening a gate in the boundary fence on a track between Millbillillie and Jundee cattle stations. The object fell on a plain to the north. No search was made at the time but in 1970 and 1971 locals found two stones; Aboriginals have found others since.

Mineralogy

Classification

See also
 Glossary of meteoritics

References

Meteorites found in Australia
Asteroidal achondrites
Wiluna, Western Australia